An Ocean Apart is a 1988 BBC television documentary series on British-American relations in the 20th century presented by David Dimbleby. The series explores the relationship between the United Kingdom and the United States from World War I to the 1980s, and examines the people, ideas, and events that have shaped the mutual history of the two nations. The series was produced by Adam Curtis.

Background
The series took three years to make, and overran its budget. David Dimbleby convinced the BBC management to air the series on BBC One, where it could garner a larger audience, rather than on the more highbrow BBC Two. Dimbleby also wrote a book to accompany the series.

Episodes

Part 1. 'Hats Off to Mr Wilson'

This episode tells how the Americans were dragged reluctantly into the First World War, of their journey across the Atlantic, their welcome in Liverpool, and their disillusion when the war was over. For President Woodrow Wilson, victory had turned sour, but America had started its journey towards world leadership.

Part 2. 'Home in Pasadena'

This episode examines the economic relations between England and the United States during the 1920s and discusses how free trade and mass production techniques after World War I changed British and U.S. manufacturing and created economic rivalry between the two countries.

Part 3. 'Here Come The British! Bang! Bang!'

This episode about the 1930s discusses how America is reluctant to enter World War II on Britain's side. Charles Lindbergh encourages U.S. neutrality in the war but Roosevelt decides to aid Britain.

Part 4. 'Trust Me To The Bitter End'

America and Britain ally in World War II to defeat Nazi Germany. Clear U.S. dominance develops with the creation of the atom bomb.

Part 5. 'If You Don't Like Our Peaches, Quit Shaking Our Tree'

In a reversal of roles, Britain becomes isolationist and the United States a superpower. Britain's dependence on the US becomes clear after the Suez crisis.

Part 6. 'Under The Eagle's Wing'

Britain cooperates with the United States during the Cuban Missile Crisis but avoids involvement in Vietnam.

Part 7. 'Turning Up The Volume'

During the 1980s, the United States and Britain form an alliance against the Soviet Union.

References

External links
 
 An Ocean Apart at BBC Genome

1988 British television series debuts
1988 British television series endings
1980s British documentary television series
1980s British television miniseries
BBC television documentaries about history during the 20th Century
BBC television miniseries
British documentary television series
English-language television shows